Mesaconic acid is one of several isomeric carboxylic acids obtained from citric acid. It is a colorless solid.

Synthesis and reactions
It is prepared from citric acid, which is first converted to itaconic anhydride by dehydration and decarboxylation. Itaconic acid anhydride is isomerized to citraconic anhydride, which is hydrolyzed and the resulting acid further isomerized under acid-catalysis to give mesaconic acid.

Hydration of mesaconic acid, a conversion catalyzed by mesaconyl-C4-CoA hydratase, gives citramalic acid.

History
This acid was studied for the first time by Jacobus H. van 't Hoff in 1874. It was later shown to be produced by Clostridium tetanomorphum. Further studies showed that this organic compound is involved in the biosynthesis of vitamin B12. It is a competitive inhibitor of fumarate reduction.

The compound has been considered as a renewable precursor to the commodity chemical methacrylic acid.

References

Dicarboxylic acids